Under Montana Skies is a 1930 American western film directed by Richard Thorpe and starring Kenneth Harlan, Slim Summerville and Dorothy Gulliver. It was produced and distributed by Tiffany Pictures, one of the leading independent studios in Hollywood.

Synopsis
In a western town, cowboy Clay Conning gets a traveling musical troupe out of financial trouble so they can put on a show. However, a cattle rustler and old adversary of his makes off with the box office cash, leading to a pursuit.

Cast
 Kenneth Harlan as Clay Conning
 Slim Summerville as 	Sunshine
 Dorothy Gulliver as 	Mary
 Nita Martan as Blondie
 Harry Todd as 	Abner Jenkins
 Ethel Wales as 	Martha Jenkins
 Lafe McKee as Sheriff Pinkie
 Christian J. Frank as 	Townsman
 Slim Whitaker as Henchman Joe 
 Charles King as Frank Blake

References

Bibliography
 Pitts, Michael R. Western Movies: A Guide to 5,105 Feature Films. McFarland, 2012.

External links
 

1930 films
1930 Western (genre) films
1930s English-language films
American Western (genre) films
Films directed by Richard Thorpe
Tiffany Pictures films
Films set in Montana
1930s American films